Eunidia castanoptera is a species of beetle in the family Cerambycidae. 

It was described by Per Olof Christopher Aurivillius in 1920.

References

Eunidiini
Beetles described in 1920